Zaborye is a rural locality (a village) in Dvurechenskoye Rural Settlement, Permsky District, Perm Krai, Russia. The population was 7 as of 2010. There are  41 streets.

Geography 
It is located 43 km south-east from Ferma.

References 

Rural localities in Permsky District